"Don't Know What to Do" may refer to:

 "Don't Know What to Do" (Dane Rumble song), 2009
 "Don't Know What to Do" (Blackpink song), 2019

See also